In parapsychology, noetics is a fringe branch of pseudoscience concerned with the study of mind as well as intellect.

Philosophy

The term itself means “the proper exercise of nous” whereas nous (“mind, understanding, intellect”) is described as “the highest faculty in man, through which - provided it is purified - he knows God or the inner essences or principles of created things through direct apprehension or spiritual perception”. In ancient Greek and medieval philosophy, noetic topics included the doctrine of the active intellect (Aristotle, Averroes) and the doctrine of the Divine Intellect (Plotinus).

The entire philosophy of noetics, which include the notions by Immanuel Kant, John Locke, René Descartes, Georg Wilhelm Friedrich Hegel, and Jean-Paul Sartre, among others is involved with thinking of intellection by analogy with vision.

Other uses
Late modern philosopher and phenomenologist Franz Brentano introduced a distinction between sensory and noetic consciousness: the former describes presentations of sensory objects or intuitions, while the latter describes the thinking of concepts. (See also Noesis (phenomenology).)

Thinkers like Lawrence Krader consider noetics as a science, an empirical discipline that concerns itself with the processes, states, and events in the real world of space and time.

Noetics is also useful in psychology such as the way it overlaps with Jamesian psychology, which deals with a range of phenomena (including emotions and feelings) that influence our thinking and knowing.

The Institute of Noetic Sciences (founded in 1973) describes noetic sciences as "how beliefs, thoughts, and intentions affect the physical world". Since the 1970s and the foundation of the Institute of Noetic Sciences by NASA astronaut Edgar Mitchell and others, the term "noetics" has been adopted by several authors such as Christian de Quincey in Deep Spirit: Cracking the Noetic Code (2008) and Dan Brown in The Lost Symbol (2009), who write about consciousness and spirituality.

Controversy 
Noetics overlaps heavily with conventional concepts of mysticism, espousing various effects on the physical world via psychic capability.

Quackwatch lists the Institute of Noetic Science on its Questionable Organizations list.

See also
Philosophy
 Neoplatonism 
 Medieval Christian philosophy of intellect
 Panpsychism
 Noology, another term for the same field

Contemporary philosophy
Noesis
Philosophy of mind

Alternative philosophy and parapsychology
 Integral thought and Ken Wilber
 Institute of Noetic Sciences and Christian de Quincey
 New Thought
 Noosphere

Cybernetics
 Technoetic

Classical psychology
 Logotherapy and Viktor Frankl

Eastern Orthodox Christianity
 Philokalia by St. Philotheos of Sinai, Volume 3, 1986, p. 16

References

Sources
 Davidson, H. A., Alfarabi, Avicenna, and Averroes, on Intellect: Their Cosmologies, Theories of the Active Intellect, and Theories of Human Intellect, New York-Oxford, Oxford University Press, 1992.
 de Quincey, C., Radical Knowing: Understanding Consciousness through Relationship, Rochester, VT: Park Street Press, 2005.
 Kenny, Anthony, Aquinas on Mind, Routledge, 1994.

Further reading
 Zarkadakis, G. (2001), "Noetics: A Proposal for a theoretical approach to consciousness", Proceedings of International Conference "Toward a Science of Consciousness: Sweden 2001; Consciousness and its place in Nature", University of Skovde, Sweden, 7–11 August 2001.

External links

Paranormal
Pseudoscience
Philosophy of mind